Rineloricaria konopickyi is a species of catfish in the family Loricariidae. It is native to South America, where it occurs in the Amazon River basin in Brazil. The species reaches 9.6 cm (3.8 inches) in standard length and is believed to be a facultative air-breather.

References 

Loricariidae
Freshwater fish of Brazil
Fish described in 1879
Taxa named by Franz Steindachner
Catfish of South America